Jinnah Convention Centre (also known as National Convention Centre) is an exhibition and convention centre based in Islamabad, Pakistan. It is named after Muhammad Ali Jinnah.

History 
The convention centre was inaugurated in 1997 at the First Extraordinary Summit of OIC.

Privatization 
The Cabinet Committee on Privatisation (CCoP) approved transaction structures for the privatization of Jinnah Convention Centre.

Exhibitions 
These are the exhibitions and festivals held in convention centre.
 Annual Technical and Oil Show
 Education Expo
 HVACR
 PTV Awards

References 

1997 establishments in Pakistan
Convention centres in Pakistan
Buildings and structures in Islamabad
Event venues established in 1997
Memorials to Muhammad Ali Jinnah